James Shaw Jr. is an American electrical technician. Shaw is known for disarming a gunman armed with a Bushmaster XM-15 during the 2018 Nashville Waffle House shooting in Antioch, Tennessee, potentially saving  lives as a result.

Early life and education 
James Shaw Jr. was born and raised in Nashville, Tennessee. He attended Hunters Lane High School. Shaw graduated from Tennessee State University. He has a daughter.

Career 
Shaw began working in the electrical field at the age of 18. In an interview, Shaw stated that "... I've been destroying stuff and putting it back together since I was a little kid. I would take stuff apart and just hope I could reassemble it." He began working at AT&T as a wire technician after graduating from Tennessee State University. At AT&T, Shaw installs internet, television, and phone connections in residences. He also manages his own company, Imount Electric.

Nashville Waffle House shooting 
When the shooting started, he ran to the bathroom—a bullet grazed his elbow and he realized there was no exit—so when he saw the gunman point the rifle down, perhaps to reload or fix a jam, he lunged and wrestled the weapon away from him, sustaining second-degree burns from grabbing the hot rifle barrel.

The gunman was captured by police a day later.  While four people died in the attack, it is likely that Shaw's action saved the lives of more restaurant patrons.  Afterwards, he established a GoFundMe campaign to raise money for the families of the four victims.  Total donations raised by Shaw surpassed  in early May 2018.  While he has been described as a hero by numerous people, including Tennessee authorities, he has said that he does not think of himself in those terms:

Awards and honors 
Shaw was honored by the president of Tennessee State University who praised Shaw for his "bravery and courage" and for saving many lives. He was honored by Tennessee lawmakers who passed a joint resolution honoring Shaw's actions. He appeared on national cable TV news shows and was honored at a game featuring the Nashville Predators. Shaw appeared on The Ellen DeGeneres Show where he met NBA basketball star Dwyane Wade. The Steve Harvey Show sent him on a trip to the island of Barbados. In April 2018, Waffle House tweeted "Yes. We will be doing things for Mr. Shaw. Details have not be finalized yet!". Details were not revealed.

In May 2018, Shaw met with Emma González, who survived the shooting at Marjory Stoneman Douglas High School and anti-gun activist who helped to found Never Again MSD, whom she tweeted about Shaw titled "my hero". Together, along with survivors and activists David Hogg, Alex Wind, and Jaclyn Corin among others, the whole group united for a special brunch at a local Tennessee Denny's.  Tennessee State University set up a scholarship fund in his name. The following month, at the 2018 MTV Movie & TV Awards, after Chadwick Boseman won an award for "Best Superhero" for his work in Black Panther, he called Shaw up to the stage and gave him the award. Shaw was presented a Gold Vail Award by Randall L. Stephenson, the Chief Executive Officer of AT&T. In 2018, he received a BET Humanitarian Award.

Shaw participated in the 2019 NBA All-Star Celebrity Game in Charlotte, North Carolina as an inaugural "Hometown Hero", scoring 8 points with 5 rebounds and posting the game's highest plus-minus with a +15.

Also in 2019, Shaw expressed interest in running in the 2019 Nashville mayoral election. He was awarded the Special Courage Award from the United States Department of Justice in April of that year.

See also
Glendon Oakley Jr.

References

1980s births
Living people
Tennessee State University alumni
21st-century African-American people
Technicians
AT&T people
People from Nashville, Tennessee
American electrical engineers

Year of birth uncertain